Penbontrhydyfothau is a hamlet in the community of Llandysiliogogo, Ceredigion, Wales, which is 70.5 miles (113.4 km) from Cardiff and 187.9 miles (302.4 km) from London. Penbontrhydyfothau is represented in the Senedd by Elin Jones (Plaid Cymru) and the Member of Parliament is Ben Lake (Plaid Cymru).

References

See also 
 List of localities in Wales by population 

Villages in Ceredigion